Nathaniel Freeman may refer to:

Nathaniel Freeman (physician) (1741–1827), physician and U.S. politician 
Nathaniel Freeman Jr. (1766–1800), U.S. politician
 Nathaniel Freeman (Nova Scotia politician) (1740–1795), merchant and political figure in Nova Scotia

See also
Nat Friedman (born 1977), Nathaniel Friedman (pronounced Freedman), computer programmer